Arling Shaeffer (1859 – February 21, 1943) was an American composer and arranger.

Shaeffer was born in Fond du Lac, Wisconsin in 1859. He was also a musician known for his mastery of fretted instruments such as the guitar, mandolin, ukulele, and banjo. He wrote a mandolin method book, Elite Mandolin Instructor, published by Lyon and Healy in 1891, and a guitar method book, the Elite Guitar Instructor, published in 1895.

Shaeffer died in Marinette, Wisconsin on February 21, 1943 and was buried in Fond du Lac.

Works

Books
 Arling Shaeffer's Barn Dance: World's Greatest Collection of Quadrilles, Jigs, Reels, and Hornpipes with All Calls (1933)
 The Washburn Mandolin Method (1898)
 Elite Mandolin Instructor (1891)
 Elite Guitar Instructor (1896)
 The Ideal Harp Instructor (1894)
 Elite Collection for Guitar: A Volume of Charming Instrumental Solos
 The Elite Method for the Ukulele: New System (1919)

References

American mandolinists
1859 births
1943 deaths
Guitarists from Wisconsin
People from Fond du Lac, Wisconsin
American male guitarists